The Hubbell Warehouse is an historic building located in downtown Des Moines, Iowa, United States.   It was listed on the National Register of Historic Places in 2010.

Architecture
The building is a rigid frame structure built of concrete and faced with brick. The building at one time housed Firestone Rubber Company and L & L Insulation. It has been renovated into apartments.

References

Industrial buildings completed in 1913
Apartment buildings in Des Moines, Iowa
National Register of Historic Places in Des Moines, Iowa
Industrial buildings and structures on the National Register of Historic Places in Iowa
1913 establishments in Iowa